Louis of Évreux (3 May 1276 – 19 May 1319, Paris) was a prince, the only son of King Philip III of France and his second wife Maria of Brabant, and thus a half-brother of King Philip IV of France.

Louis had a quiet and reflective personality and was politically opposed to the scheming of his half-brother Charles of Valois. He was, however, close with his nephew Philip V of France.

He married Margaret of Artois, daughter of Philip of Artois and sister of Robert III of Artois, and had:
 Marie (1303 – 31 October 1335), married John III, Duke of Brabant in 1311
 Charles (d. 1336), Count of Étampes married Maria de la Cerda, Lady of Lunel, daughter of Fernando de la Cerda.
 Philip III of Navarre (1306–1343), married Joan II of Navarre.
 Margaret (1307–1350), married in 1325 William XII of Auvergne
 Joan (1310–1370), married Charles IV of France

References

Sources

|-

1276 births
1319 deaths
House of Capet
House of Évreux
14th-century peers of France
Deaths from typhus
Sons of kings